Rhaphiolepis umbellata is a species of flowering plant in the family Rosaceae, native to Korea, Japan and Taiwan.

This plant has gained the Royal Horticultural Society's Award of Garden Merit. It is used in Japan as an astringent and a dyeing agent. The bark contains (−)-catechin 7-O-β-d-glucopyranoside and (+)-catechin 5-0-β-d-glucopyranoside.

References

Flora of Korea
Flora of Japan
umbellata